Athroisma is a genus of plants in the family Asteraceae first described as a genus in 1833. It is native to East Africa and Madagascar.

 Species

 species of homonym genus
William Griffith in 1854 used the same name for a genus of very different plants, thus creating an illegitimate homonym. The World Checklist categorizes his name as a synonym of the genus Trigonostemon in the Euphorbiaceae, but makes no mention of the two species names he coined. The Plant List does list the species as unresolved, i.e. of unknown application. The two species names are
 Athroisma dentatum Griff. - Bay of Bengal
 Athroisma serratum Griff.  - Tenasserim  region of Myanmar

References

Asteraceae genera
Flora of Africa
Athroismeae